Muhammad Yudi Safrizal (born 9 June 1999) is an Indonesian professional footballer who plays as a centre-back for Liga 1 club PSIS Semarang.

Club career

Karo United F.C.
In 2018, Yudi joined Karo United in the Liga 3 competition.

Persipa Pati
In 2021, Yudi is contracted by Persipa Pati to sail in Liga 2.

PSIS Semarang
PSIS Semarang completes the list of players for the second round of the 2022–23 Liga 1. On the last day of player registration, PSIS officially registered two players at once, namely striker Rizky Dwi Pangestu and stopper Muhammad Yudi Safrizal.

Yudi made his professional debut on 12 March 2023 in a match against Borneo Samarinda at the Segiri Stadium, Samarinda.

Career statistics

Club

References

External links
 Y. Safrizal at Soccerway

1999 births
Living people
Indonesian footballers
Association football defenders
Liga 1 (Indonesia) players
PSIS Semarang players
Sportspeople from North Sumatra